Milena Maria Radecka (née Sadurek-Mikołajczyk, née Sadurek) (born 18 October 1984) is a Polish volleyball player, a member of Poland women's national volleyball team and Polish club Impel Wrocław, a participant of the Olympic Games Beijing 2008, bronze medalist of European Championship 2009), Polish Champion (2004, 2011).

Personal life
She was born in Katowice, Poland. On 31 December 2007 she married Marcin Mikołajczyk. They got divorced in 2009. On 3 June 2011 she married Jakub Radecki. She has since reverted to her maiden name of Sadurek.

Career
In June 2015 she signed a contract with Polish team Impel Wrocław. She left Impel Wroclaw in May 2016 and now working as a commentator for Canal+Sport and is an ambassador for Klubów Sportowych Orange.

Sporting achievements

Clubs

National championships
 2003/2004  Polish Cup, with BKS Stal Bielsko-Biała
 2003/2004  Polish Championship, with BKS Stal Bielsko-Biała
 2005/2006  Polish Cup, with BKS Stal Bielsko-Biała
 2006/2007  Polish SuperCup 2006, with BKS Stal Bielsko-Biała
 2006/2007  Polish Championship, with BKS Stal Bielsko-Biała
 2008/2009  Polish SuperCup 2008, with PTPS Farmutil Piła
 2008/2009  Polish Championship, with PTPS Farmutil Piła
 2010/2011  Polish Cup, with Bank BPS Muszynianka Fakro Muszyna
 2010/2011  Polish Championship, with Bank BPS Muszynianka Fakro Muszyna
 2011/2012  Polish SuperCup 2011, with Bank BPS Muszynianka Fakro Muszyna
 2011/2012  Polish Championship, with Bank BPS Muszynianka Fakro Muszyna
 2012/2013  Azeri Championship, with Azerrail Baku

National team
 2001  CEV U18 European Championship
 2001  FIVB U18 World Championship
 2002  CEV U20 European Championship
 2003  FIVB U20 World Championship
 2009  CEV European Championship

References

External links
 ORLENLiga player profile

1984 births
Living people
Sportspeople from Katowice
Sportspeople from Silesian Voivodeship
Polish women's volleyball players
Olympic volleyball players of Poland
Volleyball players at the 2008 Summer Olympics
Polish expatriates in Italy
Expatriate volleyball players in Italy
Polish expatriate sportspeople in Romania
Expatriate volleyball players in Romania